The XYZ Affair was an American indie rock band from Brooklyn, New York. The band consisted of Alex Feder (guitar, vocals), Chris Bonner (bass), Russ Maschmeyer (guitar, keyboards), and Sam Rockwell (drums) who met while attending New York University. Their name comes from the 1797 diplomatic episode known as the XYZ Affair.

During the summer of 2007 the band filmed their first music video for "All My Friends" featuring former Nickelodeon TV personalities Marc Summers, Danny Cooksey, Michael Maronna and Jason Zimbler. On July 24, 2007, the band was voted "band of the day" on Spin.com.

Discography
Good To Know (But Hard To Tell) (EP) (2003)
A Few More Published Studies (2006)
Trials (Digi EP) (2008)

Members
 Alex Feder – guitar, vocals
 Chris Bonner – bass
 Russ Maschmeyer – guitar, keyboards
 Sam Rockwell – drums

References

External links
 

Indie rock musical groups from New York (state)
Musical groups from Brooklyn